Iván Darío González González (born 14 August 1987) is a Colombian middle- and long-distance runner. He won a gold medal in the 10,000 metres at the 2018 South American Games.

He represented Colombia at the 2020 Summer Olympics.

International competitions

Personal bests
Outdoor
1500 metres – 3:43.60 (Santander de Quilichao 2012)	
3000 metres – 8:05.60 (Belém 2014)
5000 metres – 13:47.97 (Walnut 2015)
10,000 metres – 28:19.94 (Palo Alto 2018)
10 kilometres – 30:41 (Bogotá 2018)
Half marathon – 1:08:02 (Medellín 2017)

References

1987 births
Living people
Colombian male middle-distance runners
Colombian male long-distance runners
Athletes (track and field) at the 2018 South American Games
South American Games gold medalists for Colombia
South American Games medalists in athletics
Central American and Caribbean Games silver medalists for Colombia
Central American and Caribbean Games bronze medalists for Colombia
Competitors at the 2014 Central American and Caribbean Games
Competitors at the 2018 Central American and Caribbean Games
Athletes (track and field) at the 2019 Pan American Games
Pan American Games competitors for Colombia
Central American and Caribbean Games medalists in athletics
South American Games gold medalists in athletics
Athletes (track and field) at the 2020 Summer Olympics
Olympic athletes of Colombia
Sportspeople from Bogotá
21st-century Colombian people